Sitipa also known as Sitipensis is a titular see of the Roman Catholic Church centered in North Africa.

Very little is known of the history of the bishopric. A Catholic Bishop Argyrius was present at the Council of Carthage (411) but the actual location of the seat of the diocese (a town called Sitipensis Plebs) is unknown.

The titular bishopric was only added to the list of titular bishops in 1989. 

The current bishop is Ignatius Chung Wang of San Francisco.

References

Roman towns and cities in Tunisia
Archaeological sites in Tunisia
Ancient Berber cities
Populated places in Tunisia
Catholic titular sees in Africa